Kunigunde of Rapperswil (died in early 4th century AD) was a Christian saint. In Old High German her name means fighter for her clan.

Life
Little is known about this saint. Maybe born in Rapperswil in Switzerland, she was one of the companions of Saint Ursula during her pilgrimage to Roma. On the way back, Kunigunde, Mechtund, Wibranda and Chrischona were sick in Rapperswil respectively Eichsel (Rapperschwier in earlier days), and soon died.

References 

Year of birth unknown
4th-century deaths
4th-century Christian saints
Late Ancient Christian female saints
German Roman Catholic saints
People from Rapperswil-Jona
4th-century European people
4th-century women

de:Kunigunde von Rapperswil